The 1976 Nevada Wolf Pack football team represented the University of Nevada, Reno during the 1976 NCAA Division II football season. Nevada competed as an independent. The Wolf Pack were led by first-year head coach Chris Ault and played their home games at Mackay Stadium.

Schedule

References

Nevada
Nevada Wolf Pack football seasons
Nevada Wolf Pack football